The 2019–20 season was Fortuna Düsseldorf's 121st season in existence and the club's 39th (non-consecutive) season in the top flight of German football. This is their second consecutive season in the Bundesliga. In addition to the domestic league, Fortuna Düsseldorf participated in this season's edition of the DFB-Pokal. The season covered the period from 1 July 2019 to 30 June 2020.

Players

Current squad

Out of squad

Out on loan

Pre-season and friendlies

Competitions

Overview

Bundesliga

League table

Results summary

Results by round

Matches
The Bundesliga schedule was announced on 28 June 2019.

DFB-Pokal

Statistics

Appearances and goals

|-
! colspan=14 style=background:#dcdcdc; text-align:center| Goalkeepers

|-
! colspan=14 style=background:#dcdcdc; text-align:center| Defenders

|-
! colspan=14 style=background:#dcdcdc; text-align:center| Midfielders

|-
! colspan=14 style=background:#dcdcdc; text-align:center| Forwards

|-
! colspan=14 style=background:#dcdcdc; text-align:center| Players transferred out during the season

|-

References

External links

Fortuna Düsseldorf seasons
Fortuna Düsseldorf